The 2017 season was Davao Aguilas' 1st season in the top flight of Philippine football. The club is the sole Mindanao-based club in the inaugural season of the PFL.

Competitions

Philippines Football League

Regular season

Note:
 a The home stadium of the club is located in Bantay, Ilocos Sur, a nearby town of Vigan. For administrative and marketing purposes, the home city of Ilocos United is designated as "Vigan"
 b Because of the ongoing works in the Marikina Sports Complex, the team will play its first few league games at the Biñan Football Stadium and Rizal Memorial Stadium and will have to groundshare with Stallion Laguna and Meralco Manila, respectively.
 c Because of the unavailability of the Davao del Norte Sports Complex, the match was played instead in Rizal Memorial Stadium, Manila.

Players

First-team squad

Foreign players
In the Philippines Football League, there can be at least four non-Filipino nationals in a team as long as they are registered. Foreign players who have acquired permanent residency can be registered as locals.

 Marko Trkulja
 Miloš Krstić
 Brad McDonald
 Harry Sawyer

References

Davao Aguilas 2017
Davao Aguilas 2017